Adrian John Earnshaw MHK (born 19 January 1950) is a Manx politician, who was the Minister of Home Affairs in the Isle of Man Government and a Member of the House of Keys for Onchan.

Early life and career
Born on 19 January 1950, he was educated at Onchan Primary School and Douglas High School, he worked at Isle of Man Bank from 1968 until his election in 2001 as MHK for Onchan. He had previously served as an Onchan Commissioner.

In December 2006, he was appointed Minister of Tourism and in 2008 was moved to Home Affairs Minister by Tony Brown.

He lost his seat in the October 2011 general election, when he was defeated by Liberal Vannin challenger Zac Hall.

Personal life
He is married to Norma (née Cain), they have 2 daughters together.

Governmental positions
Minister of Home Affairs, 2008–11
Minister of Tourism and Leisure, 2006–08

References

1950 births
Living people
Members of the House of Keys 2001–2006
Members of the House of Keys 2006–2011